Mohammed I may refer to:
 Muhammad I of Cordoba, Umayyad Emir of Cordoba in 9th century Islamic Iberia
 Mehmed I of Great Seljuk, Sultan of the Seljuk dynasty (1105–1118)
 Muhammad I of Alamut (1138–1162), see History of the Shī‘a Imāmī Ismā'īlī Ṭarīqah
 Muhammad I of Granada (1195-1273), the founder of the Emirate of Granada
 Mohammed I of Kanem, of the Sayfawa dynasty
 Mehmed I (1389–1421), Sultan of the Ottoman Empire
 Askia Mohammad I (c. 1442–1538), King of the Songhai Empire in West Africa
 Mohammed I Saadi (1554–1557), Moroccan sultan, see Askia Ishaq I
 Sultan Muhammad I of Kelantan, first Sultan of Kelantan